Acanthina monodon is a species of sea snail, a marine gastropod mollusk in the family Muricidae, the murex snails or rock snails.

References

External links
 Sánchez R., Sepúlveda R. D., Brante A. & Cárdenas L. (2011). "Spatial pattern of genetic and morphological diversity in the direct developer Acanthina monodon (Gastropoda: Mollusca)". Marine Ecology Progress Series 434: 121–131.  PDF

Ocenebrinae
Gastropods described in 1774
Taxa named by Peter Simon Pallas